Crystal Hogan (born 1977) is an American basketball referee and the only woman to referee Division 1 men's basketball.

Hogan was raised in Compton and attended Compton College, playing for their basketball team coached by Louie Nelson. She was recruited to Long Beach State on a full athletic scholarship and earned a degree in psychology before becoming a social worker.

After training as a referee, Hogan began officiating with the Long Beach Unit of the California Basketball Officials Association. She then watched the Drew League and eventually got to call games, including a foul on Kobe Bryant. She joined the Division 1 basketball officials in the 2018–19 season. She became the first woman to ever referee a men's Division 1 game when Seattle University played against Puget Sound University. She is also the first full-time referee in NCAA Men's D-1 history.

Besides her referee responsibilities, Hogan has also worked as a parole agent in California's Department of Corrections and Rehabilitations.

References 

1977 births
African-American sports officials
Living people
National Basketball Association referees
Sportspeople from Compton, California
Women basketball referees
American women referees and umpires
21st-century African-American sportspeople
20th-century African-American sportspeople
20th-century African-American women
21st-century African-American women